Maryluz (Maria Luz) Schloeter Paredes (born 5 August 1932 in Mérida, Venezuela) worked for many years with refugees in her native Venezuela, and later in several departments of the United Nations High Commissioner for Refugees (UNHCR). She was the 1980 winner of the Nansen Refugee Award, which has been given yearly since 1954 by the UNHCR for excellence in work on behalf of refugees. Her work with refugee children at the Catia Community Center in Caracas led to her nomination for the Nansen Award, which she received for her role as director general of the Venezuela branch of the International Social Service, a voluntary agency which has assisted thousands of refugees from European and Latin American countries.

Education 
Schloeter studied at the Universidad Central de Venezuela from 1952 to 1956.

She later received a Master of Science in Public Health from the Universidad Central in 1971.

Work 
 Deputy Director, Division of External Relations, United Nations High Commissioner for Refugees, Centre William Rappard, Geneva, Switzerland 1990 
 Head of Sub-Office, United Nations High Commissioner for Refugees, Karachi, Pakistan, 1988-1990.
 Special Advisor on Refugee Women to Deputy High Commissioner  UNCRH, 1988,
 Head, Social Services Section, Division of Assistance, 1984-1987, United Nations High Commissioner for Refugees, Geneva.
 Director-General, Venezuelan Branch, International Social Service, 1974-1984.
 Professor, Fey of Economic & Social Sciences, Universidad Central de Venezuela, 1974-1984.
 Head of Urban Division, Division of Social Affairs, Ministry of Health & Social Assistance, Venezuela, 1970-1974.
 Senior Officer, Fundasocial, Caracas, Venezuela, 1970.

References

External links 
 UNHCR list of Nansen Prizewinners

1932 births
People from Mérida, Mérida
Women humanitarians
Central University of Venezuela alumni
 University of Wisconsin–Madison College of Letters and Science alumni
Complutense University of Madrid alumni
Living people
Nansen Refugee Award laureates